Robert S. Mumma (born March 16, 1971) is an American college baseball coach. He served as head coach of the UMBC Retrievers baseball team from 2012 season to 2019.

Playing career
Mumma played three seasons at UMBC as a catcher, earning All-Conference honors in his final season and setting several Retrievers offensive records.  He remains the all-time home run leader at UMBC, and is tied for second in RBI all time.  He was drafted in the 13th round of the 1992 MLB Draft.  He played three seasons in the Chicago White Sox organization, reaching Class A.  Mumma completed his degree in Economics in 1993.

Coaching career
After serving as an academic advisor in the UMBC athletic department and as a volunteer assistant coach, Mumma became a full-time assistant for the 2006 season.  He became the fourth UMBC head coach after John Jancuska's retirement. on May 1, 2019, Mumma resigned from his position as head coach at UMBC.

Head coaching record
This table depicts Mumma's record as a head coach.

References

External links

Living people
1971 births
Gulf Coast White Sox players
People from Havre de Grace, Maryland
Hickory Crawdads players
South Bend Silver Hawks players
South Bend White Sox players
UMBC Retrievers baseball players
UMBC Retrievers baseball coaches
Utica Blue Sox players
Baseball coaches from Maryland